, also known as IPMA, is the main art gallery of Ishikawa Prefecture, Japan. It is one of Japan's many museums which are supported by a prefecture.

The collection includes some of the prefecture's most important cultural assets and works by artists with some connection to the region.  It is located in Kanazawa, Ishikawa within the grounds of the Kenrokuen Garden.

The gallery was first opened in 1959.  When the collection outgrew its original building, a new facility was constructed.  The current structure was completed in 1983.

The museum has a large permanent collection; and only part of it is exhibited at any one time.  The core collection includes significant works   from the Maeda family collection which had been previously housed in at the University of Tokyo.

See also
 List of National Treasures of Japan (crafts: others)
 Maeda Ikutokukai
 Prefectural museum

Notes

References
 Lillehoj, Elizbeth. (2007).  Acquisition: Art and Ownership in Edo-period Japan. Warren, Connecticut: Floating World Editions. ;

External links

  Ishikawa Prefectural Museum of Art website ;  Japanese website 

Art museums and galleries in Japan
Museums in Ishikawa Prefecture
Prefectural museums
Art museums established in 1959
1959 establishments in Japan
Ukiyo-e Museum
Buildings and structures in Kanazawa, Ishikawa